Gregory Ruzicka is general counsel to RS&W REALTY, INC., and a founding partner of the law firm of Ruzicka, Snyder & Wallace, LLP. He resides in Newport Beach, California.

In 2008, Ruzicka participated in the Fox television show, Secret Millionaire in which Ruzicka and his son covertly sought out underprivileged individuals from Imperial Beach, offering them at least $100,000 from their personal funds.

External links
 Ruzicka, Snyder & Wallace, LLP

Year of birth missing (living people)
Living people
People from Newport Beach, California
American lawyers
Place of birth missing (living people)